All the Earth is the first live debut album by Nashville-based contemporary worship band The Belonging Co. The album was released through their imprint label, TBCO Music, on September 8, 2017. The featured worship leaders on the album are Meredith Andrews, Cody Carnes, Lauren Daigle, Hope Darst, Mia Fieldes, Andrew Holt, Kari Jobe, Maggie Reed, Sarah Reeves, and Henry Seeley. Henry Seeley worked on the production of the album.

All the Earth was a commercial success, having debuted at No. 2 on the US Top Christian Albums chart.

Background
The Belonging Co is a church situated in Nashville, Tennessee, that was founded by Henry and Alex Seeley in 2014. On September 8, 2017, they released their debut live album, All the Earth, which was recorded live at their church services in Nashville.

Release and promotion
The Belonging Co released "Peace Be Still" by Lauren Daigle as the first promotional single from the album on September 1, 2017.

Critical reception
Sydney Jones of The Echo gave a positive review of the album, saying, "Overall, the album reflects this sense of living a lifestyle that encompasses the heart of what true worship looks like." Jessica Morris of Others Magazine lauded the album in her review, saying, "This album has been created by some of the best in the worship industry and it shows on every track. Production is perfect, and the authenticity of the project will compel you to draw close to Christ as you listen to this album." Fin Sheridan wrote in a review for CBN Europe, "The songs of All The Earth carry a powerful sense of God’s presence. There are plenty of moments where only the musicians play giving plenty of space for reflection, personal songs and waiting on the Holy Spirit. The lyrics are powerful, many calling for deeper intimacy with God."

Commercial performance
In the United States, All the Earth debuted on the Billboard Top Christian Albums chart at number two, having earned 3,000 equivalent album units in the first week of sales.

Track listing

Charts

Release history

References

External links
 

2017 albums